The 2018–19 season is Brighton & Hove Albion's 117th year in existence and second consecutive season in the Premier League. Along with competing in the Premier League, the club also participated in the FA Cup and EFL Cup.

The season covers the period from 1 July 2018 to 30 June 2019.

Brighton beat Manchester United at home for the second season running on 19 August 2018. The game finished 3–2 to the Albion. On 4 May 2019 Brighton's Premier League status was confirmed for a third season after bitter rivals Crystal Palace beat Cardiff 3–2 in Wales. This confirmation came exactly a year after The Seagulls secured their safety in the 2017–18 season.

In the FA Cup Brighton made the semi final where they lost to Manchester City 1–0 at Wembley. In the EFL Cup Brighton lost 1–0 to Southampton at home in the second round.

On 10 May 2019 it was announced that captain, Bruno would be retiring from football. In his last game Brighton lost 4–1 to Manchester City. As a result City defended their Premier League title.

Brighton sacked manager Chris Hughton on 13 May, one day after the final game of the season, due to a poor end of season run of three wins in 23 games meaning Brighton narrowly secured survival by two points.

On 20 May Brighton appointed Graham Potter as the new manager.

Players

Squad

Out on loan

Reserves and Academy

Transfers

Transfers in

Transfers out

Loans out

Contract

Pre-season
Brighton & Hove Albion announced five pre-season friendlies against St. Gallen, Wimbledon, Charlton Athletic, Birmingham City, and FC Nantes†.

† The opponents for this match were supposed to be Sporting Clube de Portugal but were replaced by FC Nantes due to Sporting being unable to fulfil the fixture.

Competitions

Premier League

League table

Results summary

Results by matchday

Matches
On 14 June 2018, the Premier League fixtures for the forthcoming season were announced.

FA Cup
The third round draw was made live on BBC by Ruud Gullit and Paul Ince from Stamford Bridge on 3 December 2018. The fourth round draw was made live on BBC by Robbie Keane and Carl Ikeme from Wolverhampton on 7 January 2019. The fifth round draw was broadcast on 28 January 2019 live on BBC, Alex Scott and Ian Wright conducted the draw. Draw for the quarter-final was made on 18 February by Darren Fletcher & Wayne Bridge.

EFL Cup
The second round draw was made from the Stadium of Light on 16 August.

Squad statistics

|-
! colspan=14 style=background:#dcdcdc; text-align:center|Goalkeepers

|-
! colspan=14 style=background:#dcdcdc; text-align:center|Defenders

|-
! colspan=14 style=background:#dcdcdc; text-align:center|Midfielders

|-
! colspan=14 style=background:#dcdcdc; text-align:center|Forwards

|-
! colspan=14 style=background:#dcdcdc; text-align:center| Players who have made an appearance or had a squad number this season but have left the club (All gone out on loan)

|-
|}

References

Brighton & Hove Albion F.C. seasons
Brighton and Hove Albion F.C.